The 2012 League of Ireland Cup, also known as the 2012 EA Sports Cup, is the 39th season of the Irish football knockout competition.

A total of 22 teams entered the 2012 competition. The 12 League of Ireland Premier Division and 8 League of Ireland First Division clubs were joined by Ulster Senior League champions Fanad United and the Mayo League representative side. For the First and Second Rounds of the competition, all participating clubs were split into 4 regional pools with the further rounds of the competition having an open draw. The 2012 competition commenced with the First Round on 26 March 2012.

Teams

First round
The draw for the First Round took place on 7 March 2012. The First Round games were played on 26 March 2012.

|colspan="4" style="background-color:#99CCCC" align="center"|Pool 1
||Report
||Report
|-
|colspan="4" style="background-color:#99CCCC" align="center"|Pool 2
||Report
||Report
|-
|colspan="4" style="background-color:#99CCCC" align="center"|Pool 3
||Report
|-
|colspan="4" style="background-color:#99CCCC" align="center"|Pool 4
||Report
|}

Second round
The draw for the Second Round took place on 27 March 2012. The Second Round games were played on 9/10 April 2012.

|colspan="4" style="background-color:#99CCCC" align="center"|Pool 1
||Report
||Report
|-
|colspan="4" style="background-color:#99CCCC" align="center"|Pool 2
||Report
||Report
|-
|colspan="4" style="background-color:#99CCCC" align="center"|Pool 3
||Report
||Report
|-
|colspan="4" style="background-color:#99CCCC" align="center"|Pool 4
||Report
||Report
|}

Quarterfinals
The draw for the Quarter-Finals was made on 7 May 2012 on MNS on RTÉ Two. The quarterfinal games were played on 25/26 June 2012.

Semi finals
The draw for the semi finals was made on MNS on 9 July 2012.

Final

The final will be played on Saturday, 22 September 2012 in Tallaght Stadium, Dublin.

References

External links
 Official website
 2012 League of Ireland Cup at Soccerway

League of Ireland Cup seasons
3
Cup